Joe Rabbitte (born 22 April 1970) is an Irish former hurler. He played for his local club Athenry, and was a member of the Galway senior hurling team from 1990 until 2002.

Rabbitte won his second GAA All-Stars Award in 2000.

References

1970 births
Living people
Athenry hurlers
Galway inter-county hurlers
Connacht inter-provincial hurlers